The following highways are numbered 381:

Brazil
 BR-381

Canada
Newfoundland and Labrador Route 381
 Quebec Route 381
Saskatchewan Highway 381

Japan
 Japan National Route 381

United States
  Interstate 381
  Georgia State Route 381 (former)
  Kentucky Route 381
  Maryland Route 381
  New York State Route 381 (former)
  North Carolina Highway 381
  Pennsylvania Route 381
  Puerto Rico Highway 381
  South Carolina Highway 381
  Tennessee State Route 381
  Virginia State Route 381